Thomas Morrison Lawson (16 September 1890 — 8 February 1967) was an English-born Scottish first-class cricketer.

Lawson was born in England at Penrith in September 1890. He was educated in Scotland at the Royal High School of Edinburgh. He served in the British Army during the First World War with the Lowland Royal Field Artillery, enlisting as a gunner in November 1915, and by the end of the war he held the rank of bombardier. A club cricketer for Royal High School Former Pupils, Lawson made three appearances in first-class cricket for Scotland against Ireland and Wales in 1923, and the touring South Africans in 1924. He scored 59 runs in his three matches, with a highest score of 22. Lawson died in Wales at Church Village in February 1967.

References

External links
 

1890 births
1967 deaths
People from Penrith, Cumbria
Cricketers from Cumbria
People educated at the Royal High School, Edinburgh
Royal Field Artillery soldiers
British Army personnel of World War I
Scottish cricketers